Mbongeni Mzimela (born 3 April 1985) is a South African professional footballer who plays for Tshakhuma Tsha Madzivhandila, as a goalkeeper.

Career
Born in eSikhawini, Mzimela has played for AmaZulu, Chippa United and Platinum Stars. On 19 March 2017 he scored two penalties for Platinum Stars in an African Confederation Cup match.

References

1985 births
Living people
South African soccer players
AmaZulu F.C. players
Chippa United F.C. players
Platinum Stars F.C. players
South African Premier Division players
National First Division players
Association football goalkeepers
Tshakhuma Tsha Madzivhandila F.C. players